This is a list of films produced by the Bollywood film industry based in Mumbai in 2000:

Top-earning films
Top 10 highest grossing Bollywood films of 2000.

List of released films

References

External links
 Bollywood films of 2000 at the Internet Movie Database

2000
Lists of 2000 films by country or language
 Bollywood
2000 in Indian cinema